Sticthippus is a genus of band-winged grasshoppers in the family Acrididae. There is one described species in Sticthippus, S. californicus.

References

Further reading

 
 

Oedipodinae
Articles created by Qbugbot